The 2021–22 PAOK FC season is the club's 96th season in existence and the club's 63rd consecutive season in the top flight of Greek football. In addition to the domestic league, PAOK are participating in this season's editions of the Greek Cup and in the inaugural Europa Conference League. The season covers the period from 22 July 2021 to 30 June 2022.

Coaching staff

Players

Current squad

Transfers

In

Out

Pre-season and other friendlies

Competitions

Overview

Managerial statistics

Last updated: 21 May 2022

Super League Greece

League table

Matches

Results summary

Results by round

Play-off round
The top six teams from Regular season will meet twice (10 matches per team) for places in 2022–23 UEFA Champions League and 2022–23 UEFA Europa Conference League as well as deciding the league champion.

Results summary

Results by round

Matches

Greek Cup

Round of 16

Quarter-finals

Semi-finals

Final

UEFA Europa Conference League

Third qualifying round

Play-off round

Group stage

The draw for the group stage was held on 27 August 2021.

Knockout round play-offs

Round of 16

Quarter-finals

Statistics

Squad statistics
 
The squad was informed and the official page of PAOK FC.

! colspan="13" style="background:#DCDCDC; text-align:center" | Goalkeepers
|-

! colspan="13" style="background:#DCDCDC; text-align:center" | Defenders
|-

! colspan="13" style="background:#DCDCDC; text-align:center" | Midfielders
|-

! colspan="13" style="background:#DCDCDC; text-align:center" | Forwards
|-

! colspan="13" style="background:#DCDCDC; text-align:center" | Players transferred out during the season
|-

|}

Goalscorers

As of 21 May 2022

Clean sheets
As of 21 May 2022

Disciplinary record
As of 21 May 2022

References

External links

PAOK FC seasons
PAOK
PAOK